Handball at the 2019 African Games was held from 20 to 29 August 2019 in Casablanca, Morocco.

Participants
Nine men's and ten women's teams qualified for the games, including the host country, Morocco.

Men

Women

Events

Schedule

Medal summary

Medal table

References 
 Results

 
2019 African Games
African Games
2019 African Games
Handball at the African Games